Martin is a play by Alasdair Gray, recorded on 6 January 1972 and broadcast as the last episode of the BBC TV series The Group. Gray later reworked this material for the chapter "The Proposal" in his novel Something Leather.

1972 television plays
Scottish plays